Karate at the 2011 All-Africa Games in Maputo, Mozambique was held 9-11 September 2011.

Medal summary

Men

Women

Medals table

References

2011 All-Africa Games
Karate at the African Games
2011 in karate